Ballymoty Motte is a motte and National Monument located in County Wexford, Ireland.

Location

History

The motte was built in the late 12th century after the Norman invasion of Ireland.

Description

Ballymoty Motte is round. A possible causeway post was found to the southeast of the motte during fieldwork.

References

Archaeological sites in County Wexford
National Monuments in County Wexford